The Canton Giants was the final name of a minor league baseball team that represented Canton, Ohio between 1905 and 1915. In 1905 Canton fielded a team called the Canton Protectives which a charter member of Ohio–Pennsylvania League. On July 10, 1905, the Fort Wayne Railroaders relocated to Canton for the remainder of their season to form the Canton Red Stockings of the Central League. The team remained in the Central League for the next two seasons and were renamed the Canton Chinamen, in a name play on Canton, China. The city returned to the Ohio–Pennsylvania League Canton Watchmakers. In 1910 and 1911, the club was renamed the Canton Deubers. The team name changed once again as the club rejoined the Central League in 1912 to the Canton Statesmen. The following year the club joined the Interstate League as the Canton Senators.  After not fielding a team in 1914, the club played in 1915 as the Canton Giants in the Buckeye League. Team disbanded June 11, 1915 and the league folded after the season. Canton would not have another professional team until the Canton Terriers began play in 1928.

Year-by-year record

External links
Baseball Reference Canton, Ohio

Baseball teams established in 1905
Baseball teams disestablished in 1915
Defunct minor league baseball teams
Sports in Canton, Ohio
1905 establishments in Ohio
1915 disestablishments in Ohio
Defunct baseball teams in Ohio
Buckeye League teams